Presidential elections are due to be held in Rwanda in 2024.

Background
A referendum in 2015 approved constitutional amendments that allow incumbent President Paul Kagame to run for a third term in office in 2017, as well as shortening presidential terms from seven to five years, although the latter change would not come into effect until 2024.

Electoral system
The President of Rwanda is elected in one round of voting by plurality.

References

2024 elections in Africa
2024 in Rwanda
2024